The Chicago Motor Speedway at Sportsman's Park was a motorsports race track, located in Cicero, Illinois, just outside Chicago. It was built in 1999 by a group including Chip Ganassi, owner of Chip Ganassi Racing. In 2002 the  oval shaped track suspended operations due to financial conditions in the motorsports industry. The track was also the site of horse races, for which the track was called "Sportsman's Park". The track was one of two racetracks that hosted both NASCAR auto races and horse races (the other is Dover International Speedway).

History
Before 1999, Sportsman's Park was one of the premier locations for horse racing in the area. Hawthorne Race Course, located right across the street to the south from the track, is the current host of the Illinois Derby. The two tracks operated together for decades.

In 1999, after the final season of the old Sportsman's Park, the main grandstand and infield were completely demolished to make way for the massive grandstand that was to follow.

The track held CART races from 1999 to 2002, the Toyota Atlantic Series, and NASCAR Craftsman Truck Series races in 2000 and 2001.  Chicago Motor Speedway also held American Speed Association (ASA) races. Traditional horse races remained; this time as dirt was brought in over the racing surface. Problems with the hard surface led to several scratches by trainers and races being cancelled.

In 2001, Chicagoland Speedway in Joliet was built in the hopes of attracting more racing fans and upper-level races; all Cicero races were subsequently moved to Joliet and the track closed the following year after the CART event. The few remaining horse races were transferred to Hawthorne.

Portions of the motion picture Driven were shot at Chicago Motor Speedway.

In 2003 the town of Cicero purchased the track for $18 million. During 2005 the main grandstands were torn down but the track itself remained.

On October 31, 2008, it was reported that contracts for the demolition of the remaining structures and track had been awarded. 
 
Demolition of the remaining Sportsman's Park structures and the track itself began January 5, 2009.

The western portion of the site is now a Wirtz Beverage Group distribution center, while the eastern portion is home to a Walmart supercenter, effectively removing any last remains of the track. Part of the parking lot to the west across Laramie Avenue has been converted into a public park.

Past winners

ARCA Lincoln Welders Truck Series history 

2001 Robbin Slaughter

CART Champ Car history

NASCAR Craftsman Truck Series history

2000 Joe Ruttman
2001 Scott Riggs

Mid-American Stock Car Series
1999 Mike Monroe
2000 Nate Clatfelter

Lap Records
The official race lap records at Chicago Motor Speedway are listed as:

References

External links
Retro Racing article about Chicago Motor Speedway on NASCAR.com
track history at racing-reference.info
Track statistics
Cicero racetrack will be razed to make way for mall
So Long Sportsmans - Good Riddance

Champ Car circuits
NASCAR tracks
Cicero, Illinois
Defunct horse racing venues in Illinois
Defunct motorsport venues in the United States
Motorsport venues in Illinois
Sports venues in Cook County, Illinois
1999 establishments in Illinois
2003 disestablishments in Illinois
Sports venues completed in 1999